Francesco Ceci (born 18 December 1989) is an Italian professional racing cyclist. He rode at the 2015 UCI Track Cycling World Championships.

References

External links
 

1989 births
Living people
Italian male cyclists
Place of birth missing (living people)
European Games competitors for Italy
Cyclists at the 2019 European Games
Cyclists of Fiamme Azzurre
Cyclists from Marche
Sportspeople from the Province of Ascoli Piceno
People from Ascoli Piceno